Leplaea mayombensis is a species of plant in the family Meliaceae. It is found in the Democratic Republic of the Congo, Gabon, and Uganda. It is threatened by habitat loss.

References

Meliaceae
Vulnerable plants
Taxonomy articles created by Polbot